DNA Research is an international, peer reviewed journal of genomics and DNA research. The journal was established in 1994, and is published by Oxford University Press on behalf of the Kazusa DNA Research Institute. The journal is edited by Michio Oishi.

Indexing and abstracting
In 2014, the journal's impact factor was 5.477, ranking 22nd out of 167 in the category 'Genetics & Heredity'. The journal is indexed and abstracted in the following databases:

External links

Genetics journals
Genetics literature
Publications established in 1994
Bimonthly journals